Sal Olivas (born c. 1946) is a former American football player.  A native of El Paso, Texas, Olivas attended Cathedral High School in that city.  He played college football for the New Mexico State Aggies football team from 1964 to 1967.  As a senior in 1967, he led all NCAA major college players in both total offense yards (2,190) and passing yards (2,225), and ranked second in the NCAA in pass attempts (321) and passing touchdowns (19). As of 2013, he was the Internet and inventory manager for a car dealership (Casa Nissan) in El Paso.

See also
 List of NCAA major college football yearly passing leaders
 List of NCAA major college football yearly total offense leaders

References

Living people
1946 births
American football quarterbacks
New Mexico State Aggies football players
Players of American football from El Paso, Texas